Short Creek is an unincorporated community in Brooke County, West Virginia, United States. Approximately 1/2 mile from the Ohio River, Short Creek flows from northern Ohio County into Brooke County. The creek, Short Creek, has two forks, North and South Fork. Both forks rise in the very western reaches of Washington County, and very southwestern Allegheny County, in Pennsylvania. There are several very small settlements along the creek. There were small family farms and coal mines along the creek.

There are dwellings along the creek from the bottom of Dean's Hill and the bottom of West Liberty Hill to the mouth of Short Creek at the Ohio River.

Wheeling is the primary shopping area.

References

Unincorporated communities in Brooke County, West Virginia
Unincorporated communities in West Virginia